There are at least 65 named mountains in Powder River County, Montana.
 Antelope Butte, el. 
 Bailey Hill, el. 
 Baldy Peak, el. 
 Bear Skull Mountain, el. 
 Bell Tower, el. 
 Black Eagle Butte, el. 
 Buffalo Butte, el. 
 Castle Rock, el. 
 Castle Rock, el. 
 Castle Rock, el. 
 Chico Buttes, el. 
 Cook Mountain, el. 
 Deer Creek Buttes, el. 
 Deranleau Butte, el. 
 Diamond Butte, el. 
 Dog Butte, el. 
 Dry Creek Butte, el. 
 East Fork Buttes, el. 
 Eldon Mountain, el. 
 Fighting Butte, el. 
 Fivemile Hill, el. 
 Gardner Butte, el. 
 Gobbler Knob, el. 
 Goodspeed Butte, el. 
 Haystack Butte, el. 
 Home Creek Butte, el. 
 Kelsey Hill, el. 
 Lideen Hill, el. 
 Lightning Butte, el. 
 Liscom Butte, el. 
 Little Pilgrim Butte, el. 
 Lonesome Peak, el. 
 Long Butte, el. 
 Mc Allister Butte, el. 
 Morellas Butte, el. 
 Mud Buttes, el. 
 Nipple Butte, el. 
 Oliphant Butte, el. 
 Phillips Butte, el. 
 Pine Butte, el. 
 Pine Hill, el. 
 Preston Buttes, el. 
 Rattlesnake Butte, el. 
 Rattlesnake Hill, el. 
 Reanus Cone, el. 
 Red Butte, el. 
 Red Hill, el. 
 Red Top Hill, el. 
 Rocky Butte, el. 
 Sand Creek Hill, el. 
 Sandefer Butte, el. 
 Shipley Butte, el. 
 Soldiers Mount, el. 
 Stag Rock, el. 
 Stag Rock Mountain, el. 
 Taylor Butte, el. 
 Tepee Hill, el. 
 Terrett Butte, el. 
 Threemile Buttes, el. 
 Twin Buttes, el. 
 Twin Buttes, el. 
 Two Tree Butte, el. 
 Wallop Butte, el. 
 Yager Butte, el. 
 Yarger Butte, el.

See also
 List of mountains in Montana
 List of mountain ranges in Montana

Notes

Landforms of Powder River County, Montana
Powder River